Mesalina simoni, known commonly as Simon's desert racer, is a species of lizard in the family Lacertidae. The species is endemic to Morocco.

Etymology
The specific name, simoni, is in honor of Hans Simon who was a German collector of natural history specimens.

Geographic range
In Morocco M. simoni is found on the central coast of the Atlantic Ocean.

Habitat
The natural habitat of M. simoni is rocky areas.

Reproduction
M. simoni is oviparous.

References

Further reading
Boettger O (1881). "Diagnoses Reptilium Novorum Maroccanorum ". Zoologischer Anzeiger 4: 570–572. ("Podarces (Mesalina) Simoni ", new species, pp. 571–572). (in Latin).
Schleich, H. Hermann; Kästle, Werner; Kabisch, Klaus (1996). Amphibians and Reptiles of North Africa: Biology, Systematics, Field Guide. Koenigstein, Germany: Koeltz Scientific Books. 627 pp. . (Mesalina simoni, p. 428).
Sindaco, Roberto; Jeremčenko, Valery K. (2008). The Reptiles of the Western Palearctic: 1. Annotated Checklist and Distributional Atlas of the Turtles, Crocodiles, Amphisbaenians and Lizards of Europe, North Africa, Middle East and Central Asia. Latina, Italy: Edizioni Belvedere. 580 pp. .

Mesalina
Endemic fauna of Morocco
Reptiles of North Africa
Reptiles described in 1881
Taxa named by Oskar Boettger
Taxonomy articles created by Polbot
Taxobox binomials not recognized by IUCN